Majid Al-Majid (1966 – 5 August 2018) was a Saudi folk singer who started his career in the mid-1980s, and produced 14 albums, including "Stronger Hajar", "Remember Me" and "Ya Hajri". 

Al-Majid collaborated with many poets and composers, like Khalid Abdul Rahman in the song "Ra'ash Alby Sahar Einak" and "From the torment of dimension". He also collaborated with Khalid Al-Olayan, Mubarak Al Mansour, Salah Mohammed, Ahmed Al-Jufi, Fahad Al-Madi and Khalid Al Majed.

Majed al-Majid was shot in the head by mistake and was transferred to intensive care after the incident. He died on Sunday evening 5 August 2018. His funeral was held at Al-Bawardi Mosque in Al-Azizia district in Riyadh and he was buried in the Mansurian cemeteries.

References

1966 births
2018 deaths
21st-century Saudi Arabian male singers
Deaths by firearm in Saudi Arabia
20th-century Saudi Arabian male singers